Even Lambs Have Teeth is a 2015 Canadian-French horror film written and directed by Terry Miles and starring Kirsten Prout and Tiera Skovbye. The film tells the story of two young women who take revenge on the sex trafficking ring that kidnapped and abused them.

Plot
After graduating high school, two friends decided to work for a month on an organic farm to earn money. After that, they thought they'd take a weekend shopping trip to New York City. Their trip started well. An uncle picked them up and offered them a room for the night. The next day, the uncle drove them to a bus station so they could go to the farm. Before leaving them, the uncle, who was also an FBI agent, asked them to use a code text in case something happened. On the way to the bus stop they agreed to end the texts with "balls. apple" and to write one message a day. While they were waiting for the bus at a restaurant, two handsome boys arrived and convinced them to let them drive to the organic farm. The girl sent a message to her uncle saying that everything was fine and added the words "balls. apple". However, the boys did not stop at the farm... As the girls were becoming more and more suspicious, the boys dropped them off at a local restaurant where the guys' mother gave them tea and a pie with a strange taste. When they woke up, the girls were in a container. There they were raped by the local sheriff, a man in a pig mask and another guy. They also met the local leader of the organization. In addition to these misfortunes, the leader of the organization understood that they had to send a coded message. However, he didn't understand that they had to add "balls" to "apple". The uncle decided to cancel the meeting with his future parents-in-law to go in search of the girls. He went to the local sheriff (the one who had already raped a girl) and alerted him of his niece's disappearance. The leader of the organization decided to look for two more girls and also wanted to kill the current ones. The two handsome boys went to town and left the girls with one of the rapists. One of the girls managed to charm him and then killed him by biting his jugular. She retrieves the keys and frees her friend. Guided by the same will, the two girls head straight to a tool store to seek revenge. The rest of the film is about them killing their attackers one by one and about the uncle discovering the corpses as he got along. So they killed the chief with nails in his ass, burned the pig man (who was a priest), shot the sheriff, poisoned and crushed the mother, shot one handsome guy and beat the other with baseball bats, all while rescuing freshly kidnapped girls. The film ends with them going to New York as if nothing had happened.

Cast
Kirsten Prout as Sloane
Tiera Skovbye as Katie
Garrett Black as Jed
Jameson Parker as Lucas
Michael Karl Richards as Jason
Christian Sloan as The Pastor
Patrick Gilmore as Boris
Graem Beddoes as Cigarette Man
Craig March as Sheriff Andrews
Gwynyth Walsh as Mother

Release
The film had its worldwide premiere at the Mile High Horror Film Festival on October 2, 2015.  It was then released on VOD/digital and cable platforms on May 2, 2017.  It was also released on DVD and digital platforms in the United Kingdom on June 13, 2016.

References

External links
 
 

English-language Canadian films
English-language French films
Canadian horror films
French horror films
2015 horror films
Rape and revenge films
2010s English-language films
2010s Canadian films
2010s French films